For Basie is an album by American jazz saxophonist Paul Quinichette featuring tracks recorded in 1957 and released on the Prestige label.

Reception

Allmusic awarded the album 4½ stars and reviewer Scott Yanow stated, "the sextet jams on five Basie-associated tunes from the 1930s and 40s, none of which are exactly overplayed ... Each of the songs serves as a strong vehicle for swing-oriented solos and the musicians sound quite inspired. Recommended". In JazzTimes, Stanley Dance wrote "Paul Quinichette was not styled the Vice-Pres for nothing. Of all the tenor players Lester Young inspired, he passed on the message the most faithfully. He was too often dismissed as an imitator, but Young’s language seemed to be natural to him, so that his flow was not broken up by the fashionable ejaculations necessary to others. The program of Basie hits perhaps imposed limitations of another kind".

Track listing
 "Rock-a-Bye Basie" (Count Basie, Shad Collins) – 6:34	
 "Texas Shuffle" (Herschel Evans) – 7:02	
 "Out the Window" (Basie, Eddie Durham) – 7:33
 "Jive at Five" (Basie, Harry Edison) – 9:45	
 "Diggin' for Dex" (Basie, Durham) – 7:10

Personnel 
Paul Quinichette – tenor saxophone
Shad Collins – trumpet
Nat Pierce – piano
Freddie Green – guitar
Walter Page – bass
Jo Jones – drums

References 

1957 albums
Albums produced by Bob Weinstock
Paul Quinichette albums
Prestige Records albums
Albums recorded at Van Gelder Studio
Count Basie tribute albums